Bench Lake is located in Glacier National Park, in the U. S. state of Montana. Bench Lake is south of Kootenai Peak.

See also
List of lakes in Glacier County, Montana

References

Lakes of Glacier National Park (U.S.)
Lakes of Glacier County, Montana